Karata is an Andic language of the Northeast Caucasian language family spoken in southern Dagestan, Russia by 260 Karata in 2010. There are ten towns in which the language is traditionally spoken: Karata, Anchix, Tukita, Rachabalda, Lower Inxelo, Mashtada, Archo, Chabakovo, Racitl, and formerly Siux. Speakers use Avar as their literary language.

Dialects 
The language has two dialects, Karatin and Tokitin, which slightly differ in phonetics and morphology but are mutually intelligible. There are also four subdialects; Anchikh, Archi, Ratsitl and Rachabalda.

Phonology

Consonants 

The glottal stop transcribed here is named rather ambiguously a "glottalic laryngeal" by the source.

Vowels

References 

Northeast Caucasian languages
Andic languages
Endangered Caucasian languages